2015 Empress's Cup Final was the 37th final of the Empress's Cup competition. The final was played at Kawasaki Todoroki Stadium in Kanagawa on December 27, 2015. INAC Kobe Leonessa won the championship.

Overview
INAC Kobe Leonessa won their 5th title, by defeating Albirex Niigata – with Homare Sawa goal.

Match details

See also
2015 Empress's Cup

References

Empress's Cup
2015 in Japanese women's football